Anlezy is a commune in the Nièvre department in central France.

Population

Geography
Surrounded by forests and hills, Anlezy is a town between the plains of the Loire Valley and the Morvan massif.

See also
Communes of the Nièvre department

References

Communes of Nièvre